In mathematics, Anderson acceleration, also called Anderson mixing, is a method for the acceleration of the convergence rate of fixed-point iterations. Introduced by Donald G. Anderson, this technique can be used to find the solution to fixed point equations  often arising in the field of computational science.

Definition 
A classical approach to the problem is to employ a fixed-point iteration scheme; that is, given an initial guess  for the solution, to compute the sequence  until some convergence criterion is met. However, the convergence of such a scheme is not guaranteed in general; moreover, the rate of convergence is usually linear, which can become too slow if the evaluation of the function  is computationally expensive. Anderson acceleration is a method to accelerate the convergence of the fixed-point sequence.

Given an initial guess  and an integer parameter , the method can be formulated as follows:

Conventional stopping criteria can be used to end the iterations of the method. For example, iterations can be stopped when  falls under a prescribed tolerance, or when the residual  falls under a prescribed tolerance.

With respect to the standard fixed-point iteration, the method has been found to converge faster and be more robust, and in some cases avoid the divergence of the fixed-point sequence.

Derivation 

For the solution , we know that , which is equivalent to saying that . We can therefore rephrase the problem as an optimization problem where we want to minimize .

Since the elements in  sum to one, we can make the first order approximation , and our problem becomes to find the  that minimizes . After having found , we could in principle calculate .

Furthermore, since the elements in  sum to one, we can make the first order approximation . We therefore choose

.

Solution of the minimization problem 
At each iteration of the algorithm, the constrained optimization problem , subject to  needs to be solved. The problem can be recast in several equivalent formulations, yielding different solution methods which may result in a more convenient implementation:

 solve , then set .

For both choices, the optimization problem is in the form of an unconstrained linear least-squares problem, which can be solved by standard methods including QR decomposition and singular value decomposition, possibly including regularization techniques to deal with rank deficiencies and conditioning issues in the optimization problem. Solving the least-squares problem by solving the normal equations is generally not advisable due to potential numerical instabilities and generally high computational cost.

Stagnation in the method (i.e. subsequent iterations with the same value) causes the method to break down, due to the singularity of the least-squares problem. Similarly, near-stagnation results in bad conditioning of the least squares problem. Moreover, the choice of the parameter  might be relevant in determining the conditioning of the least-squares problem, as discussed below.

Relaxation 
The algorithm can be modified introducing a variable relaxation parameter (or mixing parameter) .

Choice of  
The parameter  determines how much information from previous iterations is used to compute the new iteration . On the one hand, if  is chosen to be too small, too little information is used and convergence may be undesirably slow. On the other hand, if  is too large, information from old iterations may be retained for too many subsequent iterations, so that again convergence may be slow. Moreover, the choice of  affects the size of the optimization problem. A too large value of  may worsen the conditioning of the least squares problem and the cost of its solution. In general, the particular problem to be solved determines the best choice of the  parameter.

Choice of  
One possibility is to choose  for each iteration  (sometimes referred to as Anderson acceleration without truncation). This way, every new iteration  is computed using all the previously computed iterations. A more sophisticated technique is based on choosing  so as to maintain a small enough conditioning for the least-squares problem.

Relations to other classes of methods 
On the other hand, the convergence of an Anderson-accelerated fixed point sequence is still linear in general.

Several authors have pointed out similarities between the Anderson acceleration scheme and other methods for the solution of non-linear equations. In particular:
 Eyert and Fang and Saad interpreted the algorithm within the class of quasi-Newton and multisecant methods, that generalize the well known secant method, for the solution of the non-linear equation ; they also showed how the scheme can be seen as a method in the Broyden class;

Moreover, several equivalent or nearly equivalent methods have been independently developed by other authors, although most often in the context of some specific application of interest rather than as a general method for fixed point equations.

Example MATLAB implementation 

The following is an example implementation in MATLAB language of the Anderson acceleration scheme for finding the fixed-point of the function . Notice that:
 the optimization problem was solved in the form  using QR decomposition;
 the computation of the QR decomposition is sub-optimal: indeed, at each iteration a single column is added to the matrix , and possibly a single column is removed; this fact can be exploited to efficiently update the QR decomposition with less computational effort;
 the algorithm can be made more memory-efficient by storing only the latest few iterations and residuals, if the whole vector of iterations  is not needed;
 the code is straightforwardly generalized to the case of a vector-valued .

f = @(x) sin(x) + atan(x); % Function whose fixed point is to be computed.
x0 = 1; % Initial guess.

k_max = 100; % Maximum number of iterations.
tol_res = 1e-6; % Tolerance on the residual.
m = 3; % Parameter m.

x = [x0, f(x0)]; % Vector of iterates x.
g = f(x) - x; % Vector of residuals.

G_k = g(2) - g(1); % Matrix of increments in residuals.
X_k = x(2) - x(1); % Matrix of increments in x.

k = 2;
while k < k_max && abs(g(k)) > tol_res
    m_k = min(k, m);
 
    % Solve the optimization problem by QR decomposition.
    [Q, R] = qr(G_k);
    gamma_k = R \ (Q' * g(k));
 
    % Compute new iterate and new residual.
    x(k + 1) = x(k) + g(k) - (X_k + G_k) * gamma_k;
    g(k + 1) = f(x(k + 1)) - x(k + 1);
 
    % Update increment matrices with new elements.
    X_k = [X_k, x(k + 1) - x(k)];
    G_k = [G_k, g(k + 1) - g(k)];
 
    n = size(X_k, 2);
    if n > m_k
        X_k = X_k(:, n - m_k + 1:end);
        G_k = G_k(:, n - m_k + 1:end);
    end
 
    k = k + 1;
end

% Prints result: Computed fixed point 2.013444 after 9 iterations
fprintf("Computed fixed point %f after %d iterations\n", x(end), k);

See also 
 Fixed-point
 Fixed-point iteration
 Root-finding algorithms

Notes

References 

Numerical analysis
Quasi-Newton methods
Iterative methods